Avery Cardoza is an American author, professional gambler, and publisher. Cardoza is the owner of the Las Vegas-based Gambler's Book Shop / GBC Press.

References

1957 births
Living people
American poker players
American gambling writers
American male non-fiction writers
Vassar College alumni
American publishers (people)